Jörg-Rüdiger Wolfgang Sack (born in Duisburg, Germany) is a professor of computer science at Carleton University, where he holds the SUN–NSERC chair in Applied Parallel Computing. Sack received a master's degree from the University of Bonn in 1979 and a Ph.D. in 1984 from McGill University, under the supervision of Godfried Toussaint. He is co-editor-in-chief of the journal Computational Geometry: Theory and Applications, co-editor of the Handbook of Computational Geometry (Elsevier, 2000), and co-editor of the proceedings of the biennial Algorithms and Data Structures Symposium (WADS).
He was a co-founding editor-in-chief of the open access Journal of Spatial Information Science but is no longer an editor there. Sack's research interests include computational geometry, parallel algorithms, and geographic information systems.

References

Year of birth missing (living people)
Living people
Researchers in geometric algorithms
German computer scientists
Canadian computer scientists
University of Bonn alumni
McGill University alumni
Academic staff of Carleton University